Newhouse Academy is a coeducational secondary school located in Heywood, Greater Manchester, England.

History
Siddal Moor School opened in September 1968. It was formed from Heywood Grammar School and the Bamford Road and Hornby Street secondary modern schools. It was originally to be the new site of the grammar school. The former site of the grammar school on Hind Hill Street became the Hind Hill Centre. It was demolished in 2006 and is now the Phoenix Centre.

As part of the specialist schools programmes, Siddal Moor School was awarded Sports College status and was renamed Siddal Moor Sports College.

The school was allocated money for the refurbishment and rebuild. The project included a new building at the front for teaching and administration with the rest of the school being refurbished. The project was finished in 2011.

Previously a community school administered by Rochdale Metropolitan Borough Council, in April 2020 Siddal Moor Sports College converted to academy status and was renamed Newhouse Academy. The school is now sponsored by the Hollingworth Learning Trust.

Notable former pupils

Siddal Moor Sports College
 Nico Mirallegro, actor.
 Ryan Tunnicliffe, footballer

Siddal Moor School
 Lisa Stansfield, singer and actress

Heywood Grammar School

 John Abrahams, former captain of Lancashire Cricket Club
 George Bellairs (Harold Blundell), author
 Charles Booth CMG LVO, Ambassador to Burma from 1978–82 and High Commissioner from 1982-85 to Malta 
 Pamela Bowden , contralto, and former President of the Incorporated Society of Musicians
 David Cross, striker for West Ham in the 1970s
 Air Chief Marshal Sir Malcolm Pledger OBE AFC, Station Commander from 1990-92 of RAF Shawbury, and Chief of Defence Logistics from 2002–04
 Lister Tonge, Dean of Monmouth since 2012
 Wilfred Turner CMG CVO, High Commissioner to Botswana from 1977–81
 John Welsby CBE, the last Chief Executive from 1990-96 of the British Railways Board, and President from 1999-2002 of the CILT

References

External links
 Siddal Moor Sports College
 Heywood Grammar School
 EduBase

News items
 Demolished former school
 Teacher dies in plane crash in July 2004
 Council signs Building Schools for the Future contract

Secondary schools in the Metropolitan Borough of Rochdale
1968 establishments in England
Educational institutions established in 1968
Academies in the Metropolitan Borough of Rochdale
Heywood, Greater Manchester